Mishkino (Mişkä) is a rural locality (a village) in Nauruzovsky Selsoviet, Uchalinsky District, Bashkortostan, Russia. The population was 86 as of 2010. There are 2 streets.

Geography 
Mishkino is located 57 km southwest of Uchaly (the district's administrative centre) by road. Moskovo is the nearest rural locality.

References 

Rural localities in Uchalinsky District